This martial arts timeline is designed to help describe the history of the martial arts in a linear fashion.  Many of the articles for particular styles have discussions of their history.  This article is designed to help visualize the development of these arts, to help better understand the progression of the separate styles and illustrate where they interrelate.

The history of martial arts is challenging to document precisely, because of the lack of historical records, secretive nature of the teacher-student relationships and political circumstances during much of its history.  It is likely that many techniques were learned, forgotten, and re-learned during human history.

Bronze Age (3000 to 1000 BCE)
 20th century BCE – Murals in tomb 15 at Beni Hasan, depicting wrestling techniques, in present-day Egypt (in Africa).
 19th century BCE  - Celtic wrestling (which evolved into Cornish wrestling, Collar-and-elbow wrestling, etc) is described as being part of the Tailteann Games which continued until the time of the Normans. 
 18th century BCE – the Babylonian Gilgamesh epic includes the major hand-held weapons (sword, axe, bow and spear) used prior to the gunpowder era.

Iron Age and Antiquity (1000 BCE to CE 500)
 8th century BCE – Roughly the start of Greek Olympic Competition. Through the popularity of the Olympics, martial arts like boxing, wrestling, and pankration flourished.
 8th century BCE – Homer's Iliad describes many scenes of hand-to-hand combat in detail.
 6th century BCE – Ten styles of Śastravidyā said to have been created in India.
 c.4th century BCE – Indian epic poetry and the Vedas give the earliest written mention of South Asian martial arts. Boxing, wrestling, swordsmanship, archery, and the use of numerous weapons are all described in detail.
 264 BCE – First recorded gladiatorial combat staged in Rome during the funeral of Junius Brutus.
 50 BCE – Earliest records of a Korean martial art, namely taekkyon, found in paintings in the Muyong-chong, a royal tomb from the Goguryeo dynasty.
 CE 72 – The Colosseum opens in Rome, providing the public with the world's largest martial arts venue for over the next three hundred years.
 CE 1st century – Buddhist texts such as the Lotus Sutra mention a number of South Asian fighting arts, while the Khandhaka discourages their practice. Vajra-musti is also first attested to.
 CE 2nd century – P.Oxy. III 466, a Greek papyrus manuscript on wrestling, is written. It is the earliest known European martial arts manual.
 CE 477 – The first abbot of Shaolin Monastery was Buddhabadra, an Indian Dhyana master who came to China in AD 464 to translate Buddhist texts to Chinese. The Shaolin Temple is built at the western base of the Chinese Songshan mountain range, at the orders of Emperor Xiaowen. Successive Chinese emperors authorize fighting monks to train in the temple.

Middle Ages (500 to 1500)
 550 – Indian monk Bodhidarma teaches what will be called Chan Buddhism. While there is no evidence he was involved in the martial arts, folklore would link him to the creation of qigong and Shaolin fist, as well as crediting him with introducing forms into silat. Chán and its Japanese offshoot Zen Buddhism will be influential among martial artists.
 c.700 – Kuvalaymala describes non-keshatriya students learning martial arts from Hindu priests at gurukula or traditional educational institutions. 
 728 – Date of the "combat stele" at the Shaolin Monastery
 782 – Japanese Heian period begins. Curved swords called tachi (large sword) appear. Although samurai did not technically appear until the 12th century, in appearance these are the early curved swords commonly recognized as "samurai swords."
 c.800–900 – Agni Purana, the earliest known manual of dhanurveda, lists over 130 weapons, describes dozens of fighting stances, names techniques for various weapons, and provides a detailed discussion on archery.
 1124–1138 – Manasollasa, written by King Someswara, gives the names of Indian wrestling techniques, training exercises and diet.
 1156–1185 – Japanese samurai class emerges during the warring period between the Taira and Minamoto families. The warrior code of bushido also emerges during this time.
 c.1200 – Kalaripayattu is a martial art developed in Kerala. Its origin is unknown, according to historians, it was practiced since "at least" 12th century.
 1200–1300 – Bas-reliefs in Angkor depict armed and unarmed combat.
 c.1200 – Malla Purana, the oldest known text describing the techniques of malla-yuddha.
 c.1300 – MS I.33, the oldest extant martial arts manual detailing armed combat.
 1338 – Japanese Ashikaga era, during which the samurai class expands its influence further. Many schools of swordsmanship flourish. The period ends around 1500.
 1346 - The first annual Kırkpınar tournament is held in Edirne in Turkish Thrace 
 1400 – China sends delegations to Okinawa, which then begins trading extensively with China and Japan. The indigenous Okinawan unarmed combat art called ti or te (hand) is likely influenced by Chinese and Japanese arts over the next three centuries, forming the basis for modern karate.
 1477 – The Okinawan king Sho Shin, influenced by the Japanese, bans the carrying of arms. Similar bans occurred in Japan in 1586. Both apparently led to the underground development of striking arts and may have encouraged unarmed combat techniques designed for use against armored soldiers, such as jujutsu.

Early Modern period (1500 to 1800)
 c. 1500 – Firearms become increasingly prevalent in Europe, diminishing the importance of traditional armed fighting systems.
 1520 – At the Field of the Cloth of Gold (the summit meeting between the English King Henry VIII and the French King Francis I) are extensive Cornish wrestling matches, including between the monarchs themselves.
 1521 – Spanish conquistadors arrive in the Philippines, recording that the native population fought them off with broadswords and bamboo spears.
 1527 – Mughals invade India, bringing Middle Eastern weaponry to South Asia and, indirectly, to the Malay Archipelago. Indigenous malla-yuddha is supplanted by the Persian-derived pehlwani.
 16th–19th centuries – Most of South and Southeast Asia gradually comes under European colonial rule. Martial practices are discouraged, in some places banned outright and preserved in secret.
 1549 – Hayashizaki Minamoto is born and later founds the art of iajutsu or iaido, the art of drawing and cutting with the sword in a single motion. Successive masters of his school can be traced to the present day.
 1600 – A newer style samurai sword, called a katana or daito, is widely used. Afro-Brazilian slaves begin to develop the art of capoeira. 
1621 – Wubei Zhi is compiled by Mao Yuanyi, which includes individual martial arts training with different weapons such as the spear and Dao. 
 1641 – Chinese rebels under Li Zicheng sack the Shaolin Monastery for its support of the Ming government. While the monastery would be later rebuilt and patronized by the Qing government, it loses its fighting force and its place as a center of martial arts development.<ref>Lorge, Peter A., Chinese Martial Arts: From Antiquity to the Twenty-First Century, Cambridge: Cambridge University Press, 2012,, pp. 202–205</ref>
 1643 – Legendary Japanese swordsman Miyamoto Musashi is believed to have written The Book of Five Rings, a seminal work regarding the art and philosophy of the samurai and swordsmanship.
 1674 – Maratha Empire founded by the warrior Shivaji, bringing his native art of mardani khel to prominence. 
 1699 – Faced with growing intolerance from the Mughal rulers, Guru Gobind Singh militarized the Sikh community in order to defend their faith and independence. Sikhs and Panjabis in general subsequently become renowned as a warrior community. 
 1700s – Chinese temple frescoes depict Shaolin monks practicing unarmed combat. Okinawan te and Chinese Shaolin boxing styles mix as part of trade between the countries. Wing Chun is also founded in Yunnan.
 1713 – Sir Thomas Parkyns, known as the ‘Wrestling Baronet’, publishes his detailed book on Cornish wrestling, The Inn-Play: or, the Cornish Hugg-Wrestler, which is reprinted many times.The great wrestling match, Globe, 26 October 1826, p3.
 1743 – Jack Broughton, an English bare-knuckle fighter, writes the first rules of boxing, later to become the London Prize Ring rules in 1838.
 1750 – Techniques of taijiquan are written down.
 1752 – Formation of the ‘Cornwall and Devon Wrestling Society’, which ran Cornish wrestling tournaments and matches in London with the Prince of Wales (Duke of Cornwall) as patron.Chalk Farm Tavern and Tea Gardens, Morning Advertiser. 1 April 1844, p1.
 1767 – Burmese forces capture Siam’s capital of Ayutthaya and burn the kingdom's archives, including manuals on boxing and swordsmanship.
 1790 – Muyedobotongji is commissioned by King Jeongjo of Korea and written by Yi Deokmu, Pak Jega, and Baek Dongsu. It is one of the most comprehensive pre-modern military manuals of East Asia.

19th century
 1800–1900 – Brazilian police periodically arrest anyone caught practicing capoeira. In 1862 alone, 404 people are arrested for capoeira.
 1825–1900 – Savate shifts from its street-fighting roots to a modern sport.
 1867 – John Graham Chambers publishes a revised set of rules for boxing. They are publicly endorsed by John Douglas, 9th Marquess of Queensberry, leading the rules to become known as the "Marquess of Queensberry rules".
 1872 -  Cornish wrestling tournament in Japan organised by the Royal Marine Light Infantry;
 1882 – Jigoro Kano modifies traditional Japanese jujutsu to develop the art of judo. He opens his school, Kodokan. One of his training methods, called randori, removed more dangerous striking techniques to emphasize grappling and submission locks between students practising at full-force. His students taught judo using randori around the world during the early 20th century.
 1892 – The first world heavyweight boxing championship is fought under the Marquess of Queensberry rules of 1867, which are similar to those used today.  Jim Corbett defeats John L. Sullivan.
 1890s – British introduction of western boxing to India results in a decline of native musti-yuddha until it survives only in Varanasi.
 1893–1901 – Edward William Barton-Wright studies jujutsu in Japan and creates Bartitsu upon returning to England, one of the earliest introductions of Japanese martial arts in the West and the first known system to combine Asian and European fighting styles.
 1896 – Fencing and Greco-Roman wrestling become Olympic sports, along with shooting.
 1899 – New York governor Theodore Roosevelt starts Cornish wrestling trainingWrestler has apparently defied all traditions of athletics and is throwing all comers, The Minneapolis Journal, 21 January 1906 three times a week under Professor Mike J. Dwyer, who would go on to gain the world title in 1902.
 1900 - Archery makes its debut at the Olympics

20th century
 1904  - Freestyle wrestling becomes an Olympic Sport
 1904–1906 Yamashita Yoshitsugu gives judo lessons to President Theodore Roosevelt in 1904 and teaches judo at the U.S. Naval Academy in 1905 and 1906.
 1908 – Amateur boxing becomes an Olympic Sport.
 1920–1925 – Mitsuyo Maeda, a student of Jigoro Kano's, travels to Brazil (among other places) to spread judo. In 1925, Carlos Gracie, a student of Mitsuyo Maeda, opens his school, the first for Brazilian Jiu-Jitsu. The art is further refined by the Gracie family thereafter, particularly by Carlos' brother Helio Gracie.
 1920s–30s – Timed rounds, weight classes and standardized rules are introduced to Southeast Asian kickboxing under European influence. Modern gloves are made compulsory, replacing the hemp rope bindings, resulting in less grievous injuries and fewer deaths but also making many traditional techniques illegal. In Thailand, the newer ring-style becomes known as muay Thai (Thai boxing) while the older form is called muay boran (ancient boxing).
 1923 - The different regional Cornish wrestling associations within Cornwall merged into the Cornwall County Wrestling Association ("CCWA"), under the patronage of Commander Sir Edward Nicholl and presidency of Lord St Levan.
 1925 - Seishiro Okazaki (1890–1951) founds Danzan-ryū (檀山流), a ryū of jujutsu, in Hawaii. The Danzan-ryū syllabus is syncretic, and includes non-Japanese elements.
 1928 – Shaolin temple records are burned, destroying many documents and records of earlier martial arts.
 1930s – Imi Lichtenfeld begins developing Krav Maga in Czechoslovakia
 1932 – Mestre Bimba opens the first capoeira school, calling the style Luta Regional Baiana ("regional fight from Bahia"), because capoeira was still illegal in name.
 1935 – “Karate” becomes official name of the Okinawan martial arts, based on the traditional art of te (hand) and the term kara (empty or unarmed).
 1936 – Gichin Funakoshi publishes the first edition of his book Karate-Do Kyohan, documenting much of the philosophy and traditional kata (forms) of modern karate. A second edition was published in 1973, many years after his death in 1957. 
 1936 - James Masayoshi Mitose starts in the United States the art of Kenpo, which he learned in Japan. His style, known as Kosho Shorei-Ryū Kenpo, became an important Martial Art in the Hawaii.
 1938 – Sambo presented by Anatoly Kharlampiev; Nguyễn Lộc introduces Vovinam to the public.
 1938 - Bokator appears in the first Khmer dictionary
 1942 – Morihei Ueshiba begins using the term aikido to describe his art, which is related to aiki-jujutsu.
 1943 – Judo, karate, and various Chinese systems are officially introduced in Korea, likely beginning to mix with the indigenous Korean arts.
 1944 - William Kwai Sun Chow, a James Mitose Kenpo student in Honolulu (Hawaii), begins to teach his particular style of Kenpo developed in the '30s, called Kara-Ho Kempo, which will be the fundamental base for the American Kenpo Karate. 
 1944-1945 – Hwang Kee opens first Korean Tang Soo Do dojang or martial arts schools in Seoul, Korea. Many other schools follow. Korean military personnel receive training in martial arts.
 1945 – Choi Yong-sool travels back to Korea after living in Japan with Sokaku Takeda. He begins teaching Dai Dong Yusool (daitō-ryū aiki-jūjutsu), later to become known as hapkido.
 1945 – World War II ends, with many more American and British soldiers stationed in Asia exposed to the region's fighting systems. This includes the American Robert Trias who began teaching Asian-based martial arts in Phoenix, AZ.
 1948 - The Indonesian Pencak Silat Association (IPSI) founded
 1949–1950 – Ip Man leaves Foshan and moves to Hong Kong to escape the communist government and begins teaching Wing Chun to his first Hong Kong student Leung Sheung.
 1950 - Adriano Emperado, a William Chow student, opens his first school of a hybrid martial art called Kajukenbo (the first American mixed martial art), developed in Oahu (Hawaii) with four others Masters: Joseph Holck (Kodokan Judo, Danzan-ryu Jujutsu), Peter Young Yil Choo (Tang soo doo, Boxing and Shotokan Karate), Frank Ordonez (Danzan-ryu Jujutsu) and Clarence Chang (Sil-Lum Pai Gongfu).
 1954 - Ed Parker, another William Chow student, opens the first school in the western United States in Provo, Utah, of a new style developed on the Chow's Kara-Ho Kempo: the famous American Kenpo Karate.
 1955 – On April 11 General Choi calls a meeting between Korean masters to unify the Korean martial arts.
 1957 – Nine Korean training halls unite under the name taekwondo (way of the foot and fist).
 1959 – Bruce Lee arrives in America and begins to teach Chinese Wing chun\Kung Fu style to his first student, African American Jesse Glover, the first documented instance of a westerner learning Chinese martial arts.
 1959-1960 - Attempts made to unify kwons (KTA) and change the name from Tang Soo Do to Taekwondo.  Not all schools followed resulting in different style names with their own Hyeong. 
 1964 – Kyokushin Kaikan, a style of stand-up full-contact karate, founded by Masutatsu Oyama.
 1964 – Judo becomes an official Olympic sport.
 1966 – International Taekwon-Do Federation (ITF) is formed.
 1967 – Bruce Lee founded the hybrid martial art system Jeet Kune Do which derives aspects from various stand-up and ground style martial arts including Chinese Kung Fu, its also influenced in the formation of modern Mixed martial arts.
 1969 - H. U. Lee founds the American Taekwondo Association (ATA), which has become the largest martial arts organization in America.
 1969 - Mike Sandos and Al Dacascos travel to China and learn to integrate the soft method to their Kajukenbo and develop Wun Hop Kuen Do.
 1969 – Greek-American Jim Arvanitis introduces a modern reconstruction of pankration.
 1972 - First Kajukenbo school in Europe: a second generation Emperado student, Sergeant Ed Sheppard, Air Force, arrives at Torrejon de Ardoz Air Base (Madrid - Spain) and opened his first Kajukenbo school for basic soldiers.
 1973 – The Bruce Lee film Enter the Dragon bring influence in audience of America and around the world in Chinese and other forms of Martial arts. He dies that same year.
 1973 – World Taekwondo Federation (WTF) is formed.
 1975 – Bruce Lee's book Tao of Jeet Kune Do'' is published post-mortem. The book was based on the hybrid martial art and philosophies created by him, which created a different style in martial art system.
1981 - Mak Yuree forms the first Butthan school in Bangladesh.
 1982 – Tony Blauer created the "Panic Attack" drill that will become the Spear System.
 1985 – Satoru Sayama, forms Shooto, a shootwrestling organization. It would go on to become the first mixed martial arts organization in the world. Ukrainian martial art based on cossack combat traditions Combat Hopak is formed.
 1988 – WTF-style taekwondo becomes an Olympic demonstration sport, later becoming a full-medal sport in 2000.
 1993 – The first Ultimate Fighting Championship (UFC) is held. Brazilian Jiu-Jitsu practitioner Royce Gracie wins the event.

21st century
 2000 - Smackgirl holds their first women's mixed martial arts competition.
 2001 – The Marine Corps Martial Arts Program (MCMAP) is formalized.
 2003 - Eddie Bravo creates 10th Planet Jiu-Jitsu.
 2003 - Idan Abolnik begins to develop the Kalah system.
 2009 – Modern Arnis declared as national sport of the Philippines
 2011 - The Mongolian National Wrestling Match was held with the attendance of 6002 wrestlers, becoming the largest wrestling competition in the world 
 2021 - Karate becomes an official Olympic sport
 2022 - Bob Patrick and Jason Lower are among the first certified Kalah instructors in the US.

References

Timeline
Timeline
Martial arts